"Country House" is a song by English alternative rock band Blur. It was released as the lead single from the band's fourth studio album, The Great Escape (1995), on 14 August 1995. Released on the same day as the Oasis single "Roll with It" – in a chart battle dubbed the "Battle of Britpop" – "Country House" reached number one in the UK Singles Chart (the first of two Blur singles to reach number one, the second being 1997's "Beetlebum"). The song is the band's best-selling single, with over 540,000 copies sold as of May 2014.

Background and writing
In an interview for the South Bank Show, Damon Albarn explained that it was inspired by former Blur manager Dave Balfe, who left Blur's label Food Records and bought a house in the country.

The house of David Balfe
David Balfe moved to The Bury in 1994 at Church End, Barton-le-Clay in southern Bedfordshire off the A6. The house had 4 acres of land, nine bedrooms with five en-suite. He moved with his wife Helen and their children aged 2 and 4, when he was 36. The house was advertised in 2015 for £2m. It was Grade 2 listed in February 1975.

Content
The song is about a man who retires to an expensive country house to escape the pressures of the city. The cover art features a horizontally-flipped image of Neuschwanstein Castle in Bavaria.

Release and "battle" with Oasis
"Country House" received a great deal of media attention when Blur's label Food Records moved the original release date to the same day as Oasis's "Roll with It". The British media had already reported an intense rivalry between the two bands and this clash of releases was seen as a battle for the number one spot, dubbed the "Battle of Britpop". In the end, "Country House" won the "battle", attaining the No. 1 spot while "Roll with It" came in at No. 2.

Music video

The music video for "Country House" was directed by artist Damien Hirst, who had attended Goldsmiths, University of London, with members of Blur. It features the band and a businessman (played by Keith Allen) in a flat with the band playing a board game called "Escape from the Rat Race" before they become trapped in the game where they are with farm animals and other people before appearing in the flat again. The band appears in the video alongside British comic actor Matt Lucas and models Sara Stockbridge, Jo Guest and Vanessa Upton. It features pastiches of—or tributes to—Benny Hill (Lucas' doctor chasing scantily clad young women culminating in the entry of the milk van of Ernie (The Fastest Milkman in the West)) and Queen's 1975 video for "Bohemian Rhapsody". It was nominated for Best Video in the 1996 BRIT Awards.

The external shots of the video are at Pyrton Manor, Pyrton, in east Oxfordshire, west of junction 6 of the M40, near the B4009 and Watlington. It is now home of Vogue writer Laura Bailey, and is the former home of the 1956 High Sheriff of Oxfordshire. It is Elizabethan, built around the start of the 17th century.

Promotion and release
On 20 August 1995 the charts were officially announced. (The Chart Show announced the winner the day before, though the show's chart was unofficial) "Country House" topped the UK Singles Chart, selling 270,000 copies, compared to 220,000 sold by "Roll with It", which came in at number two. Albarn himself was surprised that "Country House" topped the charts. He told NME, "I sort of believed all the papers, including NME, who told me Oasis were going to win."

Track listings
All music composed by Albarn, Coxon, James and Rowntree. All lyrics composed by Albarn.

7-inch and cassette single
 "Country House" – 3:58
 "One Born Every Minute" – 2:18

CD1
 "Country House" – 3:58
 "One Born Every Minute" – 2:18
 "To the End (la comedie)" feat. Françoise Hardy – 5:06

CD2
 "Country House" – 5:01
 "Girls & Boys" – 5:08
 "Parklife" – 4:13
 "For Tomorrow" – 7:35
 All live tracks were recorded at the Mile End Stadium in London on 17 June 1995.

Japan CD
 "Country House" – 3:58
 "One Born Every Minute" – 2:18
 "To the End (la comedie)" feat. Françoise Hardy – 5:06
 "Charmless Man" – 3:44

Production credits
"Country House" and "Charmless Man" produced by Stephen Street
"One Born Every Minute" produced by Blur and John Smith
"To the End (la comedie)" produced by Stephen Hague, Blur and John Smith
Damon Albarn: Lead vocals, keyboards, organ
Graham Coxon: Guitar,  saxophone, backing vocals
Alex James: Bass guitar, backing vocals
Dave Rowntree: Drums, percussion, backing vocals
Additional brass by: The Kick Horns

Charts

Weekly charts

Year-end charts

Certifications

Release history

Cover versions
The song was covered by the Wurzels on their 2002 album Never Mind the Bullocks, 'Ere is The Wurzels and Out of the Blue on their 2005 album Freefall.

References

 Harris, John. Britpop! Cool Britannia and the Spectacular Demise of English Rock, 2004. 
 Live Forever: The Rise and Fall of Brit Pop. Passion Pictures, 2004.

1995 singles
1995 songs
Blur (band) songs
Food Records singles
Irish Singles Chart number-one singles
Number-one singles in Iceland
Number-one singles in Scotland
Parlophone singles
Song recordings produced by Stephen Street
Songs written by Alex James (musician)
Songs written by Damon Albarn
Songs written by Dave Rowntree
Songs written by Graham Coxon
UK Singles Chart number-one singles
Virgin Records singles
Works by Damien Hirst